Sun Valley is a populated place in Navajo County, Arizona, United States, east of Holbrook along Interstate 40.

History
"Sun Valley has always been a sleepy community along the old western highway of Old Route 66 and the newer Interstate 40. Not much is known about the settlement and how its roots began as a community, but it has and still remains largely rural and sparsely populated. Cattle Ranching has been one of the largest agricultural activity in the area. There are still some large tracts or ranch land around Sun Valley and cattle roam the open range of the landscape."

Demographics

As of the census of 2010, there were 316 people, 88 households, and 56 families residing in Sun Valley.

Education
It is in the Holbrook Unified School District. The zoned high school is Holbrook High School.

Links
Sun Valley AZ Community Website

References

Populated places in Navajo County, Arizona